These are the international rankings of Yemen.

Military 
 Institute for Economics and Peace  Global Peace Index ranked 119 out of 144

Politics
Transparency International 2021 Corruption Perceptions Index ranked 176 out of 179 
Fund for Peace 2010 Failed States Index ranked 15
Economist Intelligence Unit Shoe-Thrower's index ranked first
Good Country Index 2017, ranked 160 out of 163.
Democracy Index 2020, rank 157 out of 167.

Society
 United Nations Development Programme Human Development Index ranked 140 out of 182
 Press Freedom Index 2017, ranked 179 out of 198.
 Gender Inequality Index 2019, ranking 162 out of 162.
 Ease of Doing Business Index by the World Bank in 2020 ranked 187 out of 190.
 Human capital index in 2018, rank 145 out of 157.

References
good country index

prensa. Democracy index.

Yemen